The Celtic cross is a form of Christian cross featuring a nimbus or ring that emerged in Ireland, France and Great Britain in the Early Middle Ages. A type of ringed cross, it became widespread through its use in the stone high crosses erected across the islands, especially in regions evangelized by Irish missionaries, from the ninth through the 12th centuries.

A staple of Insular art, the Celtic cross is essentially a Latin cross with a nimbus surrounding the intersection of the arms and stem. Scholars have debated its exact origins, but it is related to earlier crosses featuring rings. The form gained new popularity during the Celtic Revival of the 19th century; the name "Celtic cross" is a convention dating from that time. The shape, usually decorated with interlace and other motifs from Insular art, became popular for funerary monuments and other uses, and has remained so, spreading well beyond Ireland.

Early history

Ringed crosses similar to older Continental forms appeared in Ireland and Scotland in incised stone slab artwork and artifacts like the Ardagh chalice. However, the shape achieved its greatest popularity by its use in the monumental stone high crosses, a distinctive and widespread form of Insular art. These monuments, which first appeared in the ninth century, usually (though not always) take the form of a ringed cross on a stepped or pyramidal base. The form has obvious structural advantages, reducing the length of unsupported side arms. There are a number of theories as to its origin in Ireland and Britain. Some scholars consider the ring a holdover from earlier wooden crosses, which may have required struts to support the crossarm. Others have seen it as deriving from indigenous Bronze Age art featuring a wheel or disc around a head, or from early Coptic crosses based on the ankh. However, Michael W. Herren, Shirley Ann Brown, and others believe it originates in earlier ringed crosses in Christian art. Crosses with a ring representing the celestial sphere developed from the writings of the Church Fathers. The "cosmological cross" is an important motif in Coelius Sedulius's poem Carmen Paschale, known in Ireland by the seventh century.

It is not clear where the first high crosses originated. The first examples date to about the ninth century and occur in two groups: at Ahenny in Ireland, and at Iona, an Irish monastery off the Scottish coast. The Ahenny group is generally earlier. However, it is possible that St. Johns Cross at Iona was the first high cross; Iona's influence as a center of pilgrimage may have led this cross to inspire the Ahenny group as well as other ringed crosses in Pictish stones.

A variety of crosses bear inscriptions in ogham, an early medieval Irish alphabet. Standing crosses in Ireland and areas under Irish influence tend to be shorter and more massive than their Anglo-Saxon equivalents, which have mostly lost their headpieces. Irish examples with a head in cross form include the Cross of Kells, Ardboe High Cross, the crosses at Monasterboice, the Cross of the Scriptures, Clonmacnoise and those in Scotland at Iona and the Kildalton Cross, which may be the earliest to survive in good condition. Surviving, free-standing crosses are in Cornwall, including St Piran's cross at Perranporth, and Wales. Other stone crosses are found in the former Northumbria and Scotland, and further south in England, where they merge with the similar Anglo-Saxon cross making tradition, in the Ruthwell Cross for example. Most examples in Britain were destroyed during the Protestant Reformation. By about A.D. 1200 the initial wave of cross building came to an end in Ireland.

Popular legend in Ireland says that the Christian cross was introduced by Saint Patrick or possibly Saint 
Declan, though there are no examples from this early period. It has often been claimed that Patrick combined the symbol of Christianity with the sun cross to give pagan followers an idea of the importance of the cross. By linking it with the idea of the life-giving properties of the sun, these two ideas were linked to appeal to pagans. Other interpretations claim that placing the cross on top of the circle represents Christ's supremacy over the pagan sun.

Notable high crosses with the Celtic shape in Ireland
 Ahenny, County Tipperary
 Ardboe County Tyrone
 Carndonagh, County Donegal
 Drumcliff, County Sligo
 Dysert O'Dea Monastery, County Clare
 Glendalough County Wicklow St. Kevin's Cross
 Killamery, County Kilkenny
 Kloster Fahan Fahan, County Donegal
 Monasterboice, County Louth
 Clonmacnoise Cross of the Scriptures, County Offaly
 Clonmacnoise North Cross, County Offaly
 Clonmacnoise South Cross, County Offaly
 Kells, County Meath
 Moone, County Kildare

Notable high crosses with the Celtic shape in Scotland

 Campbeltown Cross
 Iona Abbey Crosses
 Inchbraoch Cross
 Kildalton Cross 
 Massacre of Glencoe Monument 
 Meigle 1 Cross
 St. Martin's Cross at Iona Abbey
 St Gordian's Kirk Cross
 Govan Old Parish Church Cross
 Weem, Aberfeldy

Notable Celtic crosses in India

 Mateer Memorial Church, Kerala, India

Modern times

Celtic Revival
The Celtic Revival of the mid-19th century led to an increased use and creation of Celtic crosses in Ireland. In 1853, casts of several historical high crosses were exhibited at the Dublin Industrial Exhibition. In 1857, Henry O'Neill published Illustrations of the Most Interesting of the Sculptured Crosses of Ancient Ireland. These two events stimulated interest in the Celtic cross as a symbol for a renewed sense of heritage within Ireland.

New versions of the high cross were designed for fashionable cemetery monuments in Victorian Dublin in the 1860s. From Dublin, the revival spread to the rest of the country and beyond. Since the Celtic Revival, the ringed cross became an emblem of Celtic identity, in addition to its more traditional religious symbolism.

Modern interest in the symbol increased because of Alexander and Euphemia Ritchie. The two worked on the island of Iona in Scotland from 1899 to 1940 and popularised use of the Celtic cross in jewelry. Using the Celtic cross in fashion is still popular today.

Since its revival in the 1850s, the Celtic cross has been used extensively as grave markers. Straying from medieval usage, when the symbol was typically used for a public monument. The Celtic cross now appears in various retail items. Both the Gaelic Athletic Association and the Northern Ireland national football team have used versions of the Celtic cross in their logos and advertising. The Church in Wales since 1954 have used a flag with a Celtic cross in the centre.

A Celtic cross is often used to represent Presbyterianism, including by the US Department of Veterans Affairs.

White nationalism and white supremacy

A version of the Celtic cross is used as a symbol by white nationalists and white supremacists. It was used by Nazis in Norway in the 1930s and 1940s, and more recently it has been used by neo-Nazis, Klansmen, and other white supremacist groups. In general, white nationalists use a version of the symbol with a square cross as opposed to the traditional elongated cross. This symbol forms part of the logo of Stormfront. This use is a type of cultural appropriation.

White supremacist use of the long and short Celtic cross represents only a small minority of the symbol's use. The symbol in both forms is used by non-extremists in contexts such as Christianity, neo-Paganism, and Irish patriotism. The vast majority of uses of the Celtic cross are not associated with white supremacists.

Unicode
There is no formal code point in Unicode for this symbol, though other symbols representing the Celtic cross are included, such as that represented by code U+1F548 (🕈). Symbols designed for other purposes, such as  may be considered as alternatives.

See also

Armenian eternity sign
Basalt cross
Georgian eternity sign
Christian cross variants
Conciliation cross
Coptic cross
Forked cross
High cross
Irminsul
Maltese cross
Maypole
Picture stone
Ringed cross
Rood
Shaft cross
Solar symbol
Stone cross
Stone crosses in Cornwall
Sun cross
Swastika

References

Bibliography

 H. Richardson: An introduction to Irish high crosses. 1990, .
 J. Romilly Allen: Early Christian symbolism in Great Britain and Ireland before the thirteenth century. Whiting, London 1887. Neuauflage als The High Crosses of Ireland. Felinfach: Llanerch 1992, .
 Peter Harbison: The high crosses of Ireland. Habelt, Bonn, 3 Baende, 1991.

External links
 
 

Christian art
Insular art
Crosses by culture
High crosses
National symbols of Ireland
Nationalist symbols
Stone crosses
Celtic art